Leib Ostrow is an American music producer and the founder and president of Music for Little People record label.

Early years
Leib was born in Detroit in 1951 and developed a keen love of music at an early age. During his childhood, his mother actively supported his musical interests with outings to see artists such as Theodore Bikel and Pete Seeger, and Leonard Bernstein's Young People's Orchestra. At age 13, Leib was given a guitar for his birthday. He played guitar in a rock band throughout junior high school, transitioning into a Dylan-esque folk singer during high school. At this time, Leib began teaching guitar in a music store and within a few weeks was managing it.

At nineteen, while attending Oakland University in Rochester, Michigan, Leib opened a tiny musical instrument shop.  Within three years, with the help of his brother Laury, he expanded to a chain of four stores located across southern Michigan, becoming the largest Martin guitar dealer in the Midwest.  He then participated in manufacturing handmade guitars and banjos (Franklin Guitars, Great Lakes Banjos). Next, Leib and Laury took over a farm their father had purchased and founded one of the country’s first mail order musical instrument catalogs, Guitar’s Friend. The brothers printed the catalog on the farm, and from there, shipped instruments all over the world.  At the same time, they turned the farm into one of the finest biodynamic organic farms in the area, supplying much of southern Michigan with organic carrots and beets.

Career
Leib hitchhiked to San Francisco in 1974  to learn how to build dulcimers, the traditional American stringed folk instrument, from Rodney Albin, brother of the bass player in Big Brother and the Holding Company.  He ended up purchasing Rodney's music store in Haight-Ashbury and named it Chickens That Sing Music (inspired by a dream had by his girlfriend at the time). Leib figured that Haight Ashbury was the only place he could use that name effectively.  Chickens That Sing Music became a busy hub for the world music scene in the Bay area.  Prominent musicians including Mickey Hart from the Grateful Dead and Armanda Peraza from Santana would congregate at the store for impromptu jam sessions.  The store’s staff also set up an African music school called Oriki and an extension of Ali Akbar Khan's Indian music school.

In 1976, Leib borrowed a Volkswagen van and headed north through areas he had hitchhiked across years before, looking for a rural community in which to settle.  After a few months of traveling, he stumbled onto a “little hippie town” in southern Humboldt County in the middle of the giant redwood forests of northern California.  A forest service captain-turned realtor took him up to a tract of land  with 360 degree views, and Leib knew he had found the perfect spot to call home.

After years of hitchhiking and flying between San Francisco and Michigan to attend to business, Leib sold his interest in the music stores and began building a home out of the salvage redwood that remained from the devastating logging that had attacked his land thirty years earlier.  As he began to understand the delicate balance of the Redwood ecosystem and how much destruction had been wreaked by the aggressive logging practices of the 1950s and 60's, Leib became active in efforts to protect these forests from further devastation.  He co-founded the Trees Foundation (Treesfoundation.org), which aims to restore the ecological integrity of California’s North Coast by empowering and assisting regional community-based conservation and restoration projects.

Leib and his then-wife, started raising a family, and decided to enter the world of children's music.  A new mail order catalog was created, designed for families, and Leib took phone orders, and shipped items from a makeshift packing station in his living room.  Eventually, the catalog's circulation reached 500,000, and the "makeshift" operation of Music For Little People moved to larger quarters, eventually settling into the local town of Redway (pop. 2,000).

Two years later, Leib began producing recordings for children.  Through a mutual friend, Leib called on his long-time musical hero Taj Mahal who had a large brood of children and was passionate about collaborating on a recording for children.  The result was the award-winning "Shake Sugaree," featuring traditional American folk and blues songs, as well as originals.  Next came a benefit peace project for Ben and Jerry's Ice Cream called "Peace is the World Smilin'," on which Leib worked with artists including Pete Seeger, Sweet Honey in the Rock, and Holly Near.  Next, Leib brought his own children to the island of Kauai to work with Taj Mahal on a project with Cedella Marley Booker: a recording of the Jamaican folk music that Cedella had sung and played for her son, Bob Marley.

Michael Ostin, from Warner Bros. Records, presented Leib with an offer to either do a complete buyout, or a joint venture partnership.  Leib turned down the offer to sell Music for Little People and move down to Los Angeles to become a vice president at Warner Bros., and instead, accepted a joint venture that would allow Music for Little People to remain in Redway. A partnership was formed with Leib at the helm.  The next few years were marked by huge growth.  Leib accessed Warner Bros. Records’ array of artists, recording masters, and connections to other labels.  A recording called “Papa's Dream” with Los Lobos garnered Leib his first Grammy nomination.  He traveled to South Africa to record Ladysmith Black Mambazo and produced his first compilation, “Child's Celebration,” using children's songs recorded by Paul Simon, James Taylor, Judy Garland, The Doobie Brothers and Anne Murray.  A country music project for kids done with the support of Warner Bros. Nashville brought in tracks from artists including Faith Hill, Randy Travis, Chet Atkins, and Brenda Lee.  A blues for kids project featured B.B. King, Buckwheat Zydeco and the last song ever recorded by the legendary Jimmy Witherspoon.  In three years, total sales for Music for Little People nearly tripled.

In 1994, Leib bought back full ownership in Music for Little People, and forged a distribution arrangement with the Warner Bros. Records imprint Rhino Records.

Since then, Leib has produced over 75 more recordings including songs by Brian Johnson of AC/DC, Willie Nelson, Danny Glover and Ted Danson.  He traveled with his youngest daughter to southern Ireland to record Donovan Leitch of "Mellow Yellow" fame. Another Grammy nomination came with the recording “Shakin' a Tailfeather,” featuring Taj Mahal, Linda Tillery and the Cultural Heritage Choir.

References

 LA Times
Time Magazine
Voice of America

1951 births
Living people
Oakland University alumni
Musicians from Detroit